Archibald Edward Wones Compston (1893 – 8 August 1962) was an English professional golfer. Through the 1920s he built a reputation as a formidable match play golfer, in an era when many professionals made more money from "challenge" matches against fellow pros, or wealthy amateurs, than from tournament golf.

Compston was born in Wolverhampton.

Famously, in 1928, Compston - who had won the British PGA Matchplay Championship in 1925 and 1927 - faced Walter Hagen, who had won the American PGA Championship at match play in the previous four years, in a 72-hole challenge match, and defeated the American 18 & 17. However, when the two met again shortly afterward at The Open Championship at Royal St George's, Hagen prevailed, with Compston placing third.

In 1930, Compston nearly derailed Bobby Jones's bid for the Grand Slam at Hoylake - his third round of 68 took the lead from Jones, but inexplicably his form deserted him in the final round, and Compston shot 82 to finish down the field.

Compston played in the Ryder Cup in 1927, 1929 and 1931, defeating Gene Sarazen on one occasion.

Compston also became notable as perhaps Britain's first "celebrity" professional golfer, becoming a coach to the future Edward VIII. He was the professional at the Wentworth Club from 1945 to 1948, and later at the Mid Ocean Club in Bermuda.

Tournament wins (11)
This list may be incomplete
1925 Leeds Cup, Glasgow Herald Tournament, British PGA Matchplay Championship
1926 Leeds Cup
1927 Ifield Tournament, British PGA Matchplay Championship
1928 Eastern Open Championship
1929 Roehampton Invitation
1930 Daily Dispatch Southport Tournament
1935 Roehampton Invitation
1945 Yorkshire Evening News Tournament

Results in major championships

Note: Compston only played in The Open Championship and the U.S. Open.

NT = No tournament
DQ = disqualified
CUT = missed the half-way cut
"T" indicates a tie for a place

Team appearances
Great Britain vs USA (representing Great Britain): 1926 (winners)
Ryder Cup (representing Great Britain): 1927, 1929 (winners), 1931
France–Great Britain Professional Match (representing Great Britain): 1929 (winners, captain)
England–Scotland Professional Match (representing England): 1932 (winners), 1935 (winners)
England–Ireland Professional Match (representing England): 1932 (winners)

References

English male golfers
Ryder Cup competitors for Europe
Sportspeople from Wolverhampton
1893 births
1962 deaths